Hickory Tavern, is an unincorporated community in Laurens County, South Carolina, United States. It is classified by the federal government as a class U6 populated place. It is centered at the intersection of US Route 76 and South Carolina Highway 101.

It is believed that the town is named for a tavern that operated in a grove of hickory trees in the area.

The 1849 Last Will and Testament of Joseph Sullivan bequeathed "one tract of land, suppose to contain four hundred acres including the Hickory Tavern" to his minor son, Milton A. Sullivan.  George W. Sullivan was named as the trustee "until my son Milton A arrives of age."

The Charlton Hall Plantation House was added to the National Register of Historic Places in 1995.

References

Unincorporated communities in Laurens County, South Carolina
Unincorporated communities in South Carolina